The Lalkhani are a Muslim Rajput community, found in North India. They are a sub-division of the Bargujar  clan of Rajputs, who converted to become Muslims. The community is found mainly in the districts of Aligarh, Hathras, Bulandshahr,  Badaun. They are called Lalkhani Which does not apply to all Muslim Bargujar, as those originally from Haryana.

Origin 

The Lalkhani Rajputs once held estates in the districts of Bulandshahr. From their clan came the, Muhammad Baquar Ali Khan The Raja Of Pindrawal And Muhammad Ahmad Said Khan Chhatari "Nawab of  prominent Muslim League politician, and last Prime Minister of the Hyderabad State.

See Also  
 Urdu-speaking people

References 

Rajput clans of Uttar Pradesh
Muslim communities of Uttar Pradesh
Bargujar